Vanthaan Vendraan is a 2011 Indian Tamil-language action thriller film written and directed by R. Kannan that stars Jiiva, Nandha and Taapsee Pannu in the lead roles. Principal photography began on 27 August 2010, and the film released on 16 September 2011 to mixed reviews.

Plot
The film opens to a school in a village where a boy recites a national anthem before all the staff and students of the school. Another boy is seen running to school as he is late. His teacher punishes him while comparing him to the boy who recited earlier, who is revealed to be his younger half-brother. An enmity grows in the older brother as he is always compared to his younger brother. The younger brother burns the photo of the older brother's father as he was the reason for his defeat in the school's kabbadi match. In retaliation, the older brother throws the younger brother into a well. Watching him get drowned in the well, the older brother runs away from the village.

The film then opens to Mumbai, just a few years after the incident. The older brother grows up to become Ramana, who is an underworld don doing smuggling business with the help of the local police and political support. He tries to kill Govardhan, who is a rival to him, but he fails. Arjun tries to see him for many days but is not able to. Finally, with the help of Ramana's cook Delhi, he manages to see him and tells him about his life story. Arjun is a boxer and accidentally meets Anjana while going to a boxing selection match. He could not attend the match because he spoils the miniature that Anjana was carrying for her interview the same day.

He helps her out, and in turn, Anjana travels to Kerala to meet the person in charge of the boxing selection match so that Arjun can get a second chance. However, it turns out that Arjun has come with her to Kerala to express his love for her, which she does not reciprocate. Finally, she agrees on the condition, if her father agrees. When Arjun meets Anjana's father, he rejected Arjun's marriage proposal to his daughter before being accidentally shot and killed by Ramana when he tries to kill Govardhan. Anjana proposes a deal to Arjun that if he makes Ramana surrender to the police, she will marry him, which he accepts. Arjun has come to Ramana to make him surrender, but Ramana and his gang thrash Arjun and throw him out.

Anjana pesters Arjun, as he is taking a long time to make Ramana surrender. In order to speed things up, Arjun demolishes Ramana's smuggling business and leaks about him to the press. Ramana's business is sealed by the police, and they plan to kill him in an encounter. Since all this happened because of Arjun, a fight ensues between both of them where Arjun is stabbed fatally by Ramana at the end. Delhi comes in and reveals to Ramana that Arjun is the latter's younger brother whom he threw in the well in their childhood. It is also revealed that what he told him about Anjana and her revenge for her father's death was all a fake and imaginative story so that Ramana will have compassion for their love, as Ramana's love was a failure. Arjun has thought Ramana would succumb to Arjun's plea and surrender to the police so that he would escape from the police's encounter and he can return to their family.

Ramana realizes himself and surrenders to the police, but not before admitting Arjun to a hospital, saving his life. Arjun goes back to his home and reunites with his family. Ramana writes to his family in a letter, while he is in jail, promising them that he will come back and will be more responsible for now. His parents were touched by this. Ramana is set to be married to a girl his family set him up with. In the end, a girl identical to Arjun's imaginary, fake girlfriend, Anjana, meets Arjun, similar to their meeting in his story. The film ends with the note that "THE LOVE IN HIS IMAGINATION BECOMES TRUE".

Cast

 Jiiva as Arjun
 Nandha as Ramana
 Taapsee Pannu as Anjana
 Rahman as Mumbai Commissioner
 Santhanam as Delhi
 Azhagam Perumal as Arjun and Ramana's father
 Malavika Avinash as Arjun and Ramana's mother
 Raviprakash as Anjana's father
 Sapan Saran as Ramana's lover
 John Vijay as Training Coach
 Ulhas Tayade as Ashok Tiwari
 Ranjith Velayudhan
 Nizhalgal Ravi as Police Officer
 Manobala as Muralidharan
 Singamuthu as Vegetable Seller
 G. Marimuthu
 Maran
 Kamala Krishnaswamy
 Nandha Saravanan as Ramana's gang member
 A. R. Manikandan as Shop Man
 Rail Ravi
 Kadhal Kannan
 Sathya
 Prabhu
 Master Vasanth as Young Arjun
 Sree Raam as Young Ramana
 Rachana Maurya in an item number

Production
Reports had claimed that the plot was based on the American film Going the Distance, which was denied by Kannan. The scenes were shot in Sri Sivasubramaniya Nadar College of Engineering with all lead roles. Later, Tamannaah was replaced by Taapsee in the film.

Critical reception
The film opened to mixed and negative reviews. The critic from Sify rated the film as "average" citing that "the key problem with the film is its script and narration", whilst describing Thaman's music as the "major plus point". Behindwoods gave 2.5 out of 5 with a verdict: "Fairly entertaining with an unexpected twist".

Soundtrack

The soundtrack was composed by Thaman and Gopi Sundar. The soundtrack launch was held on 21 May 2011 at Sathyam Cinemas, which was attended by several prominent celebrities. The soundtrack received mixed reviews. Behindwoods.com gave a score of two and a half stars out of five and deemed the album as a "Decorous effort by Thamman", further citing "Vandhaan Vendraan has some promising tracks that urge music lovers to hear them over and again. With a couple of songs "Anjana" and "Kanchana Mala" turning to be cherry-picking, the rest of the songs might gain attention with the visuals."

References

External links
 

Films set in Mumbai
2011 action thriller films
2011 crime action films
2011 crime thriller films
Indian action thriller films
Indian crime action films
Indian crime thriller films
2011 films
2010s Tamil-language films
Films shot in Mumbai
Indian nonlinear narrative films
Films scored by Thaman S
Indian gangster films
Films directed by R. Kannan